The ten-cent coin is the lowest-denomination circulating coin of the Hong Kong dollar. It is the oldest coin denomination to still be in circulation in Hong Kong. Since its first issue in 1863, there has only been one period (1942–1947) where the coin was not in use.

History
The first ten-cent coin, issued in 1863, featured the portrait of Queen Victoria on its obverse and was minted until the year of her death, 1901. Her successor, King Edward VII of the United Kingdom then featured on the obverse from 1902 to 1905, despite reigning until 1910. In the early 1900s during China's currency reform, in some provinces of China, such as Guangxi, some residents and retailers refused Chinese 10-cent coins, and requested instead the "kwaitau", or "ghost's head" coin, a euphemism for the Hong Kong 10-cent coin.

After a long period of no minting, the coin returned in 1935 and 1936 with King George V of the United Kingdom on its obverse. The dimnesons remained the same although the coin's composition was changed to copper-nickel.

In 1948 a new coin was issued for this denomination: a nickel-brass coin 20.57 mm in diameter, weighing 4.54 g and with a thickness of 1.85 mm and a plain edge. From 1948 to 1951, it bore the portrait of George VI on its obverse, without his title of Emperor of India, lost in 1947. In 1955, despite succeeding in 1952, the portrait of Queen Elizabeth II was first minted on the obverse. From 1937, onwards the coin featured a reeded security edge; this changed to a reeded edge in 1971.

Because of its similarity in size and weight to the 50-cent piece, the ten-cent piece was redesigned with a plain edge from 1982. The portrait of Queen Elizabeth II by Arnold Machin, introduced to the coins of the pound sterling in 1968, was placed on the obverse. On 1 January 1984 the old ten-cent coin was demonetised. In 1985 the portrait of the Queen by Machin was replaced by the portrait sculpted by Raphael Maklouf, used until 1992 and the launch of Hong Kong coins without the portrait of a reigning British Monarch.

The shape and size has been maintained at launch of the bauhinia series in 1993. In 1997, a commemorative coin was issued for the hand over of Hong Kong to China. It featured a traditional Chinese junk sailing boat.

Mintage
Mintmarks
H = Heaton
KN = King's Norton

References

Coins of Hong Kong
Ten-cent coins